Epermenia iniquellus is a moth of the family Epermeniidae. It is found in Europe (from southern France to Greece, Poland and Ukraine) and from Turkey to Iran, Kazakhstan and Tajikistan.

The wingspan is 9.5–10 mm.

The larvae feed on Peucedanum officinale and Ferula caspica.

References

Moths described in 1867
Epermeniidae
Moths of Europe
Moths of Asia